Henry "Harry" Philmore Langdon (June 15, 1884 – December 22, 1944) was an American comedian who appeared in vaudeville, silent films (where he had his greatest fame), and talkies.

Life and career
Born in Council Bluffs, Iowa, Langdon began working in medicine shows and stock companies while in his teens. In 1906, he entered vaudeville with his first wife, Rose Langdon.  By 1915, he had developed a sketch named "Johnny's New Car", on which he performed variations in the years that followed. In 1923, he joined Principal Pictures Corporation, a company headed by producer Sol Lesser. He eventually went to The Mack Sennett Studios, where he became a major star.  At the height of his film career, he was considered one of the four best comics of the silent film era. His screen character was that of a wide-eyed, childlike man with an innocent's understanding of the world and the people in it. He was a first-class pantomimist. 

Most of Langdon's 1920s work was produced at the famous Mack Sennett studio. His screen character was unique and his antics so different from the broad Sennett slapstick that he soon had a following. Success led him into feature films, directed by Arthur Ripley and Frank Capra. With such directors guiding him, Langdon's work rivaled that of Charlie Chaplin, Harold Lloyd, and Buster Keaton. Many consider his best films to be The Strong Man (1926), Tramp, Tramp, Tramp (1926), and Long Pants (1927). Langdon acted as producer on these features, which were made for his own company, The Harry Langdon Corporation, and released by First National.

After his initial success, he fired Frank Capra and directed his own films, including Three's a Crowd, The Chaser,  and Heart Trouble, but his appeal faded.  These films were more personal and idiosyncratic, and audiences of the period were not interested.  Capra later claimed that Langdon's decline stemmed from the fact that, unlike the other great silent comics, he never fully understood what made his own film character successful. However, Langdon's biographer Bill Schelly, among others, expressed skepticism about this claim, arguing that Langdon had established his character in vaudeville long before he entered movies, added by the fact that he wrote most of his own material during his stage years. History shows that Langdon's greatest success was while being directed by Capra, and once he took hold of his own destiny, his original film comedy persona dropped sharply in popularity with audiences. This is likely not due to Langdon's material, which he had always written himself, but due to his inexperience with the many fine points of directing, at which Capra excelled, but at which Langdon was a novice. On the other hand, a look at Langdon's filmography shows that Capra directed only two of Langdon's 30 silent comedies. His last silent film, and the last one Langdon directed, Heart Trouble,  is a "lost film", so it is difficult to assess whether he might have begun achieving a greater understanding of the directorial process with more experience. The coming of sound, and the drastic changes in cinema, also thwarted Langdon's chances of evolving as a director and perhaps defining a style that might have enjoyed greater box office success.

Transition to sound films
Langdon's babyish character did not adapt well to sound films; as producer Hal Roach remarked, "He was not so funny articulate." Roach starred Langdon in eight sound shorts in 1929–1930, which were not popular enough to keep the series going. Langdon did land occasional one-shot roles in feature films, including See America Thirst (Universal, 1930), opposite Slim Summerville, and Hallelujah, I'm a Bum (United Artists, 1933), opposite Al Jolson.

Langdon was still a big enough name to command leads in short subjects. He reunited with his Sennett co-star Vernon Dent for a series of two-reelers with Educational Pictures in 1932-34. Columbia Pictures, initiating its own short-comedy unit, hired Langdon away from Educational in 1934. In 1938, beginning with the Columbia short A Doggone Mixup, Langdon adopted a Caspar Milquetoast-type, henpecked-husband character that served him well. He alternated this new character with his established "helpless innocent" character.

Langdon was considered to be the live-action role model for  Dopey in Snow White and the Seven Dwarfs, but Walt Disney rejected the idea. Eddie Collins played the role instead.

In 1938 Langdon returned to the Hal Roach studio for a surprise guest appearance in the screwball comedy feature There Goes My Heart. While at Roach he contributed to comedy scripts as a writer, notably for Laurel and Hardy. When Stan Laurel's contract with Roach expired, Oliver Hardy's contract was still in force, leading Roach to cast Langdon opposite Hardy in the 1939 antebellum comedy Zenobia.

Comeback
In 1940 Harry Langdon made a comeback as a starring comedian in feature-length films. Misbehaving Husbands (1940) was a domestic comedy with Langdon using his henpecked-husband character. It was also a comeback film for the director, William Beaudine, an important silent-film director whose fortunes had declined by the late 1930s. Although Misbehaving Husbands was produced and released by PRC, the tiniest of the Hollywood studios, Langdon and Beaudine received critical raves for their work: "Preview house rewarded them with practically solid laughter" (Boxoffice), ; "Easily [Langdon's] best performance in years" (Motion Picture Daily). In the trade, the picture was noteworthy enough to re-establish both Langdon and Beaudine, albeit in low-budget features. They soon worked steadily at Monogram Pictures. 

Misbehaving Husbands turned out to be Langdon's last starring feature; he shared two subsequent leads with co-star Charley Rogers. Langdon continued to play mild-mannered goofs in features and short subjects.

Death and recognition
He suffered a cerebral hemorrhage during the filming of the Republic musical, Swingin' on a Rainbow, and died on December 22, 1944. All funeral arrangements were handled by Langdon's old friend Vernon Dent. Langdon was cremated and his ashes interred at Grand View Memorial Park Cemetery in Glendale, California.

At the height of his career, Langdon was making $7,500 per week, a fortune for the times. Upon his death, The New York Times wrote, "His whole appeal was a consummate ability to look inexpressibly forlorn when confronted with manifold misfortunes—usually of the domestic type. He was what was known as 'dead-pan'...the feeble smile and owlish blink which had become his stock-in-trade caught on in a big way, and he skyrocketed to fame and fortune..."

In 1997, his hometown of Council Bluffs celebrated "Harry Langdon Day" and in 1999 named Harry Langdon Boulevard in his honor. For his contribution to the motion picture industry, Harry Langdon has a star on the Hollywood Walk of Fame at 6925 Hollywood Boulevard. 

Langdon is briefly depicted in the biographical film Stan & Ollie, played by Richard Cant, where he is preparing for the shooting of Zenobia with Oliver Hardy.

Langdon's son, Harry Langdon Jr., went on to a successful career as a Hollywood photographer.

Critical appraisal

Film historian Richard Koszarski offers this assessment of Langdon's career:

Partial filmography
† – denotes entry part of the Columbia Pictures short subject series

 The Sky Scraper aka The Greenhorn (1923)
 A Tough Tenderfoot aka Horace Greeley, Jr. (1923)
 A Perfect Nuisance aka The White Wing's Bride (1923)
 Picking Peaches (1924, Short) as Harry - A Shoe Clerk
 Smile Please (1924, Short) as Otto Focus - the Hero
 Scarem Much (1924, Short) as Ringside Spectator (uncredited)
 Shanghaied Lovers (1924, Short) as A Shanghaied Sailor
 Flickering Youth (1924, Short) as Gus Guitar
 The Cat's Meow (1924, Short) as Eddie Elgin
 His New Mamma (1924, Short) as The Farmer Boy
  The First Hundred Years (1924, Short) as A Newly-Wed
 The Luck o' the Foolish (1924, Short) as Mr. Newlywed
 The Hansom Cabman (1924, Short) as Harry Doolittle
 All Night Long (1924, Short) as Harry Hall - the Boy
 Feet of Mud (1924, Short) as The Boy - Harry Holdem
 The Sea Squawk (1925, Short) as Sandy McNickel - an Immigrant
 His Marriage Wow (1925, Short) as The Groom - Harold Hope
 Boobs in the Woods (1925, Short) as The Boy - Chester Winfield
 Plain Clothes (1925, Short) as Harvey Carter
 Remember When? (1925, Short) as Harry Hudson
 Lucky Stars (1925, Short) as Harry Lamb
 There He Goes (1925, Short) as Harry
 Saturday Afternoon (1926, Short) as Harry Higgins
 Tramp, Tramp, Tramp (1926) as Harry Logan
 Soldier Man (1926, Short) as The Soldier / King Strudel the 13th of Bomania
 Ella Cinders (1926) as Harry Langdon (uncredited)
 The Strong Man (1926) as Paul Bergot
 Long Pants (1927) as Harry Shelby
 His First Flame (1927) as Harry Howells
 Three's a Crowd (1927) as Harry - the Odd Fellow
 Fiddlesticks (1927, Short) as Harry Hogan
 The Chaser (1928) as The Husband
 Heart Trouble (1928, director) as Harry Van Housen
 Hotter Than Hot (1929, Short)
 Sky Boy (1929, Short)
 Skirt Shy (1929, Short) as Dobbs, the butler
 The Head Guy (1930, Short) as Harry, Temporary Station Master
 The Fighting Parson (1930, Short) as The Banjo Player
 The Big Kick (1930, Short) as Harry
 The Shrimp (1930, Short) as Harry
 The King (1930, Short) as The King
 A Soldier's Plaything (1930) as Tim
 See America Thirst (1930) as Wally
 The Big Flash (1932, Short) as Harry
 Tired Feet (1933, Short)
 Hallelujah, I'm a Bum (1933) as Egghead
 The Hitchhiker (1933, Short) as The Hitchhiker
 Knight Duty (1933, Short) as Harry
 Tied for Life (1933, Short) as The Groom

 Marriage Humor (1933, Short)
 Hooks and Jabs (1933, Short)
 The Stage Hand (1933, Short) as Harry
 My Weakness (1933) as Dan Cupid
 On Ice (1933, Short)
 Roaming Romeo (1933, Short)
 Circus Hoodoo (1934, Short)
 Petting Preferred (1934, Short)
 Counsel on De Fence (1934, †, Short) as Darrow Langdon
 Shivers (1934, †, Short) as Ichabod Somerset Crop
 His Bridal Sweet (1935, †, Short) as Himself
 Love, Honor, and Obey (the Law!) (1935, Short) as Harry
 The Leather Necker (1935, †, Short)
 Atlantic Adventure (1935) as Snapper McGillicuddy
 His Marriage Mix-Up (1935, †, Short)
 I Don't Remember (1935, †, Short) as Harry Crump
 Block-Heads (1938, writer)
 A Doggone Mixup (1938, †, Short) as Himself
 Stardust (1938) as Otto Schultz
 Sue My Lawyer (1938, †, Short) as Himself
 There Goes My Heart (1938) as Minister (uncredited)
 Zenobia (1939) as Professor McCrackle
 The Flying Deuces (1939, writer)
 A Chump at Oxford (1940, writer)
 Saps at Sea (1940, writer)
 Goodness! A Ghost (1940, Short)
 Cold Turkey (1940, †, Short) as Himself
 Misbehaving Husbands (1940) as Henry Butler
 Sitting Pretty (1940)
 Road Show (1941, writer)
 All-American Co-Ed (1941) as Hap Holden
 Double Trouble (1941) as Albert 'Bert' Prattle
 What Makes Lizzy Dizzy? (1942, †, Short) as Harry
 House of Errors (1942) as Bert
 Tireman, Spare My Tires (1942, †, Short) as Himself
 Carry Harry (1942, †, Short) as Harry
 Piano Mooner (1942, †, Short) as Harry
 A Blitz on the Fritz (1943, †, Short) as Egbert Slipp
 Blonde and Groom (1943, †, Short) as Harry
 Here Comes Mr. Zerk (1943, †, Short) as Egbert Slipp
 Spotlight Revue (1943) as Oscar Martin
 To Heir is Human (1944, †, Short) as Harry Fenner
 Defective Detectives (1944, †, Short) as Harry
 Hot Rhythm (1944) as Mr. Whiffle
 Mopey Dope (1944, †, Short)
 Block Busters (1944) as Higgins
 Snooper Service (1945, †, Short)
 Pistol Packin' Nitwits (1945, †, Short) as Harry
 Swingin' on a Rainbow (1945) as Chester Willouby (final film role)

See also
 List of United States comedy films

References

Further reading
 Charles Reed Jones, Editor. Breaking Into The Movies. The Unicorn Press, 1927.
 William Schelly. Harry Langdon: His Life and Films. 2nd edition. McFarland, 2008. 
 Koszarski, Richard. 1976. Hollywood Directors: 1914-1940. Oxford University Press. Library of Congress Catalog Number: 76-9262.

External links

 
 
 Harry Langdon at Film Reference
 Photographs and literature

1884 births
1944 deaths
American male film actors
American male silent film actors
Silent film comedians
Vaudeville performers
Male actors from Iowa
People from Council Bluffs, Iowa
Hal Roach Studios short film series
Slapstick comedians
20th-century American male actors
20th-century American comedians
American male comedy actors
Columbia Pictures contract players
Burials at Grand View Memorial Park Cemetery